Vendetta: Secrets of a Mafia Bride is a 1990 American-Italian television crime-drama miniseries  directed by Stuart Margolin. It is based on the novel Donna d'onore by Sveva Casati Modignani. It had a sequel in 1993, Vendetta II: The New Mafia.

Plot

Cast

 Carol Alt as Nancy Pertinace
 Eric Roberts as  Sean McLeary
 Eli Wallach as  Frank Latella
 Serena Grandi as  Addolorata Pertinace, Nancy's mother
 Burt Young as  Vincent Dominici
 Nick Mancuso as  Danny La Manna
  Jason Allen as  Junior
 Victor Argo as  Persico
 Thomas Calabro as  Nearco
 Eva Grimaldi as  Brenda 
 Anthony DeSando as  Albert La Manna
 Enrico Lo Verso as  Vito
 Stuart Margolin as Chinnici
 Billy Barty as  Victor
 Gianni Nazzaro as  Nancy's father
 Mickey Knox as  Corallo 
 Max Martini as  Taylor Carr

References

External links
 

1990s American television miniseries
Italian television miniseries
Mafia films
Films scored by Riz Ortolani
Films directed by Stuart Margolin